La dottoressa preferisce i marinai (translation: The Lady Doctor Prefers Sailors) is a 1981 commedia sexy all'italiana directed by Michele Massimo Tarantini, starring  Alvaro Vitali with Gianni Ciardo as a comic duo.

Plot
The ship of the Italian Navy commander Carlo Morelli (Renzo Palmer) anchors at Bari port and he arranges a rendezvous with his mistress Dr. Paola (Paola Senatore) at a hotel but who arrives is his wife Clara (Marisa Mell). Meanwhile, cleaners Alvaro (Vitali) and Gianni (Ciardo) witness a murder at the hotel and the assassin (Gordon Mitchell) starts trying to kill them. They are now in the middle of an international conspiracy.

Cast
Alvaro Vitali: Alvaro
Gianni Ciardo: Gianni 
Renzo Palmer: Carlo Morelli
Paola Senatore: Dr. Paola
Marisa Mell: Clara Morelli
Gordon Mitchell: Soviet spy
Renzo Montagnani: suicide man
Sabrina Siani: massage therapist
Bruno Minniti: Lieutenant Ardenzi
Renzo Ozzano: Captain Smith
Lucio Montanaro: hotel attendant

External links

1981 films
Commedia sexy all'italiana
Films directed by Michele Massimo Tarantini
1980s sex comedy films
1981 comedy films
1980s Italian-language films
1980s Italian films